The 2016 Russian Women's Football Championship was the 25th season of the Russian women's football top level league. Zvezda 2005 Perm were the defending champion.

Rossiyanka won the season in front of Zvezda Perm.

League table
Teams played each other three times.

Top scorers

References 

2016
Wom
Rus
Rus
Wom